Captain Everything! were a punk band from Watford, United Kingdom. Formed in 1998, the band play high tempo pop-punk, which was branded "Bubblegum Thrash". Renowned for their heavy touring schedule, they have played all over the UK and Europe, touring with bands such as The Vandals, Capdown, and Nerf Herder.  They were part of the roster of London punk label Household Name Records.

History
They met at Parmiter's School and formed in 1998.

House Hold Name records signed the band in 2002 and re-issued the album Learning To Play With....

Their extensive touring of the UK included playing the Lockup Stage at Reading Festival. They have also toured in Russia, Canada and Japan.

In 2006, a proposed tour with The Suicide Machines was cancelled. In the same year the band had two releases and toured in support of the Canadian punk rockers Propagandhi.

Other projects
Richard Phoenix became the drummer of The Steal until they split up in 2009.

Band members
Jon Whitehouse - bass guitar/vocals (1998-2011)
Lewis Froy - guitar/vocals (1998-2011)
Blake Davies - drums (2005–2007)
Richard Phoenix - drums (1998–2005, 2010–2011)

Timeline

Discography

Albums/DVDs

Singles

Music videos
 Bomb Song (2006)

References

Underground punk scene in the United Kingdom
People educated at Parmiter's School, Garston